Étienne Marcel is a station on Line 4 of the Paris Métro. It is located in the northeastern part of the 1st arrondissement.

Location
The station is located under the Rue de Turbigo, at the level of Rue Étienne-Marcel.

History
The station was opened on 21 April 1908 as part of the first section of the line from Châtelet to Porte de Clignancourt. It takes its name from Rue Étienne-Marcel, which is named for Étienne Marcel, a 14th-century revolutionary and provost of the merchants under John II.

Nearby are the Saint-Eustache church and the Louvre Post Office, which is the only post office in France open nearly 24 hours a day (except between 6:20 and 7:20 a.m.).

In 2019, 2,676,549 riders entered this station, which places it in 195th position for metro stations out of 302.

Passenger services

Access
The station has only one exit (a monument historique) that leads to 14 Rue de Turbigo.

Station layout

Platforms
Étienne Marcel is a standard configuration station with two platforms separated by the metro tracks. Its vault is elliptical. As part of the automation of Line 4, its platforms have been upgraded with platform screen doors. These were installed between October and November 2019.

Bus connections
The station is served by line 29 of the RATP bus network.

Gallery

References

 Roland, Gérard (2003). Stations de métro. D’Abbesses à Wagram. Éditions Bonneton.

Paris Métro stations in the 1st arrondissement of Paris
Paris Métro stations in the 2nd arrondissement of Paris
Railway stations in France opened in 1908